Martha Ellen Haylett is an Australian politician who is the current member for the district of Ripon in the Victorian Legislative Assembly. She is a member of the Labor Party and was elected in the 2022 state election, after defeating incumbent MLA Louise Staley.

Political career
Martha announced her candidacy for Ripon on 21 January 2022, Prior to this she was an advisor to Premier Daniel Andrews. Martha is an advocate for affordable housing. She was elected to the seat of Ripon with a margin of 2.7%.

Personal Life 
Martha lives in Creswick with her fiancé.

References 

Living people
Members of the Victorian Legislative Assembly
21st-century Australian politicians
21st-century Australian women politicians
Australian Labor Party members of the Parliament of Victoria
Women members of the Victorian Legislative Assembly
1991 births